The Witness is a 2015 American documentary directed by James D. Solomon. His directorial debut, it was produced by Solomon, with William Genovese as Executive Producer and co-produced by Melissa Jacobson. It is narrated by Genovese who investigates the killing of his sister, Catherine Susan "Kitty" Genovese, in Kew Gardens, a neighborhood in the New York City borough of Queens, on March 13, 1964, by Winston Moseley.

Upon its release film received rave reviews from critics and was shortlisted with fourteen other documentaries from 145 entries submitted to the 89th Academy Awards in Academy Award for Best Documentary Feature category.

Plot
The name Kitty Genovese became synonymous with bystander apathy after The New York Times reported that 38 witnesses heard her being murdered — and did nothing to help. The Witness follows Genovese's brother Bill's search for the truth and ultimately debunks initial reports and long-held public opinion about the circumstances of Kitty Genovese's murder.

Cast

 Kitty Genovese as herself (archive footage)
 William Genovese as himself (brother of Kitty)
 Sophia Farrar as herself (neighbour of Kitty)
 Abe Rosenthal as himself
 Mike Wallace as himself
 Gabe Pressman as himself
 Shannon Beeby as herself

Reception
The review aggregator website Rotten Tomatoes reported a 91% approval rating for all critics, based on 57 reviews, with an average rating of 7.7/10. The website's critical consensus reads, "The Witness can't hope to truly untangle the true crime case at its center, but offers a series of fascinating — and troubling — insights in the attempt." On Metacritic, the film holds a score of 79 out of 100, based on 18 critics, indicating "generally favorable reviews".

Entertainment Weeklys, Joe McGovern also lauded the series saying, "The powerful thrust of the film comes from its critique of the media." Justin Chang  of LA Times lauded the film and said, "The strength of The Witness lies in its recognition that the truth is often not just elusive but unattainable." Reviewing for RogerEbert.com film critic Matt Zoller Seitz wrote, "This is a powerful movie, but perhaps its greatest triumph is that for a brief time it resurrects Kitty Genovese, and lets us see her as a person" Farran Smith Nehme of New York Post explained, "Solomon and Genovese remind us that all witnesses can be unreliable, in one way or another. The emotional impact comes from the gentle way the film reveals Kitty Genovese as a loving, vibrant person, and not as a symbol."

Film critic Joe Morgenstern of The Wall Street Journal also reviewed the series positively saying, "The Witness is remarkable for its emotional impact, and its clarity. The picture that emerges isn’t perfectly clear; the whole truth will never be known, Bill Genovese says. What he has made known, though, is valuable." Indiewires critic, Kate Erbland said, ""Although The Witness functions just fine as a true crime documentary in the vein of such en vogue offerings as Serial and 'Making a Murderer, the film makes its mark when it leans in on the deeply personal connection between its subject and its storyteller." The New York Timess Andy Webster praises the film and said, "A re-creation of the night, with an actress playing the screaming victim while Mr. Genovese observes, is harrowing." The Hollywood Reporters Frank Scheck expressed,"Few films feel as cathartic as James Solomon's documentary The Witness."

Pat Padua of The Washington Post positively reviewed the series and said, "The Witness makes an encouraging case for the argument that society is not as apathetic as we fear. But it also reveals a troubling phenomenon: our willingness to accept all that we are told as truth. Writing for Variety, Nick Schager wrote, "The Witness functions as a project of not only confrontation but resurrection, as Bill's sleuthing sheds new light on Kitty’s personality, romances and career, and thus finally re-emphasizes her as a flesh-and-blood person rather than just a famous victim." Moderately reviewing for The A.V. Club, A.A. Dowd said, "Perhaps because any real closure is impossible at this point, The Witness eventually embraces its own inconclusiveness, like some documentary cousin to "Zodiac."

The Witness was named as one of the best films of 2016 by Richard Brody of The New Yorker and David Edelstein New York.

Accolades

References

External links
 
 
 
 

2015 documentary films
2015 films
American documentary films
2010s English-language films
2010s American films